The 2015–16 Kennesaw State Owls men's basketball team represented Kennesaw State University during the 2015–16 NCAA Division I men's basketball season.  The Owls were led by first-year head coach Al Skinner and played their home games at the KSU Convocation Center on the university's campus in Kennesaw, Georgia as members of the Atlantic Sun Conference (A-Sun). They finished the season 11–20, 7–7 in A-Sun play to finish in a tie for fifth place. They lost in the quarterfinals of the A-Sun tournament to Florida Gulf Coast.

Roster

Schedule

|-
!colspan=9 style="background:#000000; color:white;"| Non-conference regular season

|-
!colspan=9 style="background:#000000; color:white;"| Atlantic Sun Conference regular season

|-
!colspan=9 style="background:#000000; color:white;"| Atlantic Sun tournament

References

Kennesaw State Owls men's basketball seasons
Kennesaw State